A special election was held in  on October 8, 1810 to fill a vacancy left by the resignation of William Stedman (F) on July 16, 1810.

Election returns

Bigelow took his seat December 14, 1810

See also
List of special elections to the United States House of Representatives

References

United States House of Representatives 1810 11
Special elections to the 11th United States Congress
Massachusetts 1810 11
1810 11
Massachusetts 11
United States House of Representatives 11